James Steven Collins (born 1 December 1990) is a professional footballer who plays as a striker for  club Derby County and the Republic of Ireland national team. Starting his career at Aston Villa, he did not break through to the first team and has since represented a number of teams in the English Football League and the Scottish Premiership.

Collins has won promotion from the fourth tier of English football four times so far in his career: twice as a runner-up with Shrewsbury Town, once as champions with Northampton Town, and most recently with Luton Town. Born and raised in England, he represented the Republic of Ireland at under-19 and under-21 levels before making his senior international debutand scoringin 2019 in a friendly match against Bulgaria.

Career

Aston Villa
Born in Coventry, West Midlands, Collins started his career with Aston Villa. Collins attended the Cardinal Wiseman Catholic School in Coventry.

In his final years at the club's academy and reserve teams, Collins had been a prolific goalscorer for the academy notching up 23 goals. His impact led manager Martin O'Neill to give the Collins opportunity to prove himself on loan the following season.

He was loaned out in October 2009 on a three-month deal to Darlington, where he made his professional debut in a 3–0 loss to Barnet. He scored his first goal for Darlington in a 2–1 defeat at Hereford United on 31 October 2009. Three weeks later, on 21 November 2009, Collins scored again, a 35-yard lob, in a 5–2 loss against Chesterfield. Collins' spell at Darlington began successfully, however he later found it difficult to remain in the first team and later returned to Aston Villa on 22 January 2010 when his loan spell terminated.

On 15 October 2010, Collins joined League Two club Burton Albion on an emergency loan, and immediately made an impact by scoring two goals in his first three matches for the club. His good performance earned Collins a nomination of the League Two Player of the Month award.

His good performance led Collins to stay at the club making a permanent move. On 15 November 2010, his loan spell was extended for second month. After adding two more goals to his tally, his loan spell was extended for the third time. However, manager Paul Peschisolido believed Collins would not stay at the club after January.

Prior to the 2010–11 season, Collins joined up with Scottish club Aberdeen for a trial, appearing in a friendly match away to Tamworth. At this time, he became known as "Jim Collins", presumably to avoid confusion between himself and his Aston Villa teammate of the same name. Following the trial, it appeared Collins had returned to The Villans, however it was reported that Aberdeen boss Mark McGhee had not given up on signing the player. Nonetheless, Collins remained at Villa following the departure of O'Neill. Caretaker boss Kevin MacDonald named the striker in his 20-man squad to travel to Rapid Vienna in the UEFA Europa League on 18 August 2010. On Aston Villa's official website, he has been called James Collins Jnr.

Shrewsbury Town
On 7 January 2011, Collins signed permanently for League Two club Shrewsbury Town on an 18-month contract. He made his debut the following day, setting up a goal for Shane Cansdell-Sherriff, in a 3–1 loss against Morecambe. Collins scored his first goals for the club on 18 January, notching twice in a 3–1 win over Accrington Stanley and scored another brace on 29 March, in a 3–1 victory over Rotherham United, managing eight goals in total during his first half season at Shrewsbury.

The 2011–12 season started well for Collins when he scored his first league goal in the opening match of the season, Shrewsbury Town drawing 1–1 against Plymouth Argyle, and scoring again in a 3–2 win over Derby County in the first round of the League Cup days later.

On 20 September 2011, he scored against Premier League team Arsenal in the third round of the League Cup, giving Shrewsbury an early lead in a match they would ultimately lose 3–1 at The Emirates, and hit another brace on return to League duty four days later in a 2–0 win over Torquay United to send the club into second place in the table.

Following an injury to midfielder Nicky Wroe, Collins temporarily assumed penalty taking duties for Shrewsbury Town, scoring from the spot in a 2–1 home win against Southend United. During the season, manager Graham Turner compared Collins to Wolves legend Steve Bull, due to his strength and determination, also commenting that he believed he could continue to improve his goal scoring record.

In his first full season at Shrewsbury, Collins made 47 appearances, scoring 16 goals in all competitions, and was the club's top scorer as they won promotion to League One. Collins was offered a new deal and Turner expected him to re-sign, however he attracted interests from other clubs such as Watford, Coventry City and Sheffield United, ultimately opting to join fellow promoted club Swindon Town.

Swindon Town
On 18 June 2012, Collins signed for Swindon Town. Upon the move, Shrewsbury manager Graham Turner expected the fee to be settled by a tribunal, which was eventually settled at £140,000 plus add-ons, ultimately causing Swindon to enter a transfer embargo due to overspending.

Collins first goals for the club came against Premier League team Stoke City in the second round of the League Cup, scoring a hat-trick to help knock out Stoke 4–3 after extra time. Collins first league goal came eleven matches into Swindon's campaign and proved to be the winner despite being scored in the first minute against Bury on 6 October 2012. Collins then added his second goal in the league the following match against the club he supported as a boy, Coventry, this time helping Swindon rescue a point on 13 October. The New Year proved to be good fortune for Collins as he scored four goals against Portsmouth on 1 January 2013 in a 5–0 thrashing. After the match, Collins described scoring four goals, after coming on from the bench, as "surreal experience".

Despite manager Paolo Di Canio resigning, the introduction of new manager Kevin MacDonald allowed Collins to add to his goal tally with strikes against promotion-chasing Tranmere Rovers and Yeovil Town. By the end of the season, Collins had scored 18 goals in all competitions, his last a consolation effort in a 3–1 loss against Scunthorpe United, who fell to final day relegation despite their win. Collins finished his only season at Swindon Town as the club's top-scorer in the league and in all competitions.

It was reported on 21 July 2013 that Swindon had accepted a £200,000 bid from Hibernian for Collins.

Hibernian
Hibernian confirmed that Collins had signed a three-year contract with the club on 29 July 2013. Collins made his Hibs debut, making his first start in the opening match of the 2013–14 Scottish Premiership season, in a 1–0 loss against Motherwell. After five matches without a goal, Collins scored the winning goal against St Johnstone on 14 September and scored another the following week, in a 2–0 win over against St Mirren.

Following Pat Fenlon's departure, Collins vowed to score more goals under new manager Terry Butcher after scoring less goals than expected by that point. In Butcher's first match as Hibernian Manager, Collins scored a last minute goal, in a 1–1 draw against Partick Thistle on 7 November 2013. Collins scored the opening goal in a 2–1 win against fierce rivals Hearts on 2 January 2014. A week after scoring in the derby, Collins scored twice, as Hibernian lost 3–2 to St Mirren on 18 January 2014. Reflecting on his time at Hibernian, Collins told his then Hibernian's teammate Owain Tudor Jones on The Longman’s Football World podcast that he regretted joining the club, though he had "did have some happy memories" there.

Return to Shrewsbury
Following Hibernian's relegation, Collins re-signed for former club Shrewsbury Town on 4 June 2014 on a two-year contract with an option for a third year. He scored twice on his return debut, securing a point in a 2–2 draw away to AFC Wimbledon on 9 August. The following month, he scored the only goal as Shrewsbury beat Norwich City in the League Cup, notably sending the club through to the fourth round of the competition for the first time since the 1986–87 season.

Surpassing his previous season's goal tally on 8 November, when he scored his seventh goal of the season in all competitions against Walsall in the FA Cup, he continued to weigh in with important goals as Shrewsbury climbed into the top reaches of the League Two table, hitting double figures for the season with a brace against Exeter City, following this up with the opener in a 2–0 away win at Oxford United on Boxing Day, and the second goal in a 3–0 home win against bottom of the table Hartlepool United in January 2015.

Collins ended the 2014–15 season as Shrewsbury's top scorer, with 17 goals in all competitions as he won promotion to League One with the club for the second time in his career, having finished as runners up to Burton Albion.

Collins began the 2015–16 with a goal in each of the opening two matches, a 2–1 home defeat to Millwall, and a 2–1 away victory over Blackburn Rovers in the League Cup. After a spell where he found himself in and out of the team, he was restored to the starting line-up, and named captain for the first time in an FA Cup first-round tie at non-League team Gainsborough Trinity. After scoring the only goal of the match, he won the plaudits of manager Micky Mellon, who commented that wearing the captain's armband had turned Collins into "Superman".

In January 2016, following a 7–1 defeat to Chesterfield in which he was named captain, Collins was loaned out to Northampton Town until the end of the season. He scored on his debut for the club, the opening goal in a 2–1 victory at Plymouth Argyle. He played regularly during the second half of the season as Northampton were promoted from League Two as champions.

After returning from his loan spell, Collins contract at Shrewsbury was cancelled by mutual consent in July 2016.

Crawley Town
After his release from Shrewsbury, Collins signed a three-year contract with League Two club Crawley Town on 11 July 2016. He scored his first goal for Crawley in a 1–1 draw with Doncaster Rovers on 13 August 2016.

Luton Town
On 29 June 2017, Collins signed a three-year contract with League Two club Luton Town for an undisclosed fee. On his Luton debut on 5 August 2017, he scored a hat-trick in an 8–2 win over Yeovil Town.

His contract was extended by a further year at the end of the 2017–18 season after a promotion clause was triggered as a result of Luton's promotion to League One.

In the 2018–19 season Collins was named the League One Player of the Year at the EFL Awards as he helped Luton to back-to-back promotions after scoring 25 goals as they move up to the Championship.

Collins scored his first second-tier goal of his career against Middlesbrough on the opening night of the 2019–20 season. He went on to score 14 goals in total in the Championship, becoming Luton’s top scorer for the second season running.

On 12 December 2020, Collins scored his second hat-trick of his Luton's career, in a 3–0 win against Preston North End.

Cardiff City
Collins rejected a new contract with Luton at the end of the 2020–21 season and signed for fellow Championship club Cardiff City on a two-year contract. He scored his first goal for Cardiff in a 2-1 win against Preston North End on 20 November 2021.

International career
Collins, who was born and raised in England, is also eligible to represent the Republic of Ireland at international level through his parents. He has represented Ireland at under-19 and under-21 levels. On 11 October 2011, Collins scored his first hat-trick of his international career, as Republic of Ireland under-21 beat Liechtenstein U-21, with a score 4–1. Upon a move to Hibernian, Collins hoped that his performances would get him a call-up to the senior squad.

He received his first call-up to the senior national team in March 2019, when Mick McCarthy named him in a 38-man provisional selection for UEFA Euro 2020 qualifiers against Gibraltar and Georgia.

Collins made his full international debut for Ireland on 10 September 2019, coming off the bench to score the third goal in a 3–1 win against Bulgaria at the Aviva Stadium.

On 24 March 2021, Collins scored his first competitive goal for Ireland in a 3-2 defeat away to Serbia in the 2022 FIFA World Cup qualifiers.

Controversy
In October 2011, Collins was arrested along with former Aston Villa teammate Barry Bannan after a Range Rover hit the central reservation of the M1 motorway in Nottinghamshire. The following month, Nottinghamshire Police confirmed that he would not face any charges, although Bannan was charged with four offences.

On 15 March 2016, whilst attending the Cheltenham Festival at Cheltenham Racecourse, Collins and Milton Keynes Dons' Samir Carruthers were photographed urinating into a beer glass before Collins poured it over a balcony. The next day, Collins apologised for his behaviour and was fined two weeks' wages.

Career statistics

Club

International

As of match played 27 March 2021. Republic of Ireland score listed first, score column indicates score after each Collins goal.

Honours
Shrewsbury Town
Football League Two runner-up: 2011–12, 2014–15

Northampton Town
Football League Two: 2015–16

Luton Town
EFL League One: 2018–19
EFL League Two runner-up: 2017–18

Individual
PFA Team of the Year: 2018–19 League One

References

External links

1990 births
Living people
Footballers from Coventry
English footballers
Republic of Ireland association footballers
Republic of Ireland youth international footballers
Republic of Ireland under-21 international footballers
Republic of Ireland international footballers
Association football forwards
Aston Villa F.C. players
Darlington F.C. players
Burton Albion F.C. players
Shrewsbury Town F.C. players
Swindon Town F.C. players
Hibernian F.C. players
Northampton Town F.C. players
Crawley Town F.C. players
Luton Town F.C. players
Cardiff City F.C. players
Derby County F.C. players
English Football League players
Scottish Professional Football League players
English people of Irish descent